{{DISPLAYTITLE:C13H25NO2}}
The molecular formula C13H25NO2 (molar mass: 227.34 g/mol, exact mass: 227.1885 u) may refer to:

 Cyprodenate
 4-Nonanoylmorpholine (MPA or MPK)

Molecular formulas